The Yamaha PTX8 is a digital sample-based percussion tone generator built by Yamaha, in late 1986. It was included in the Yamaha D8 electronic drum kit.

Features 
The Yamaha PTX8 Percussion Tone Generator is an 8-instrument multi-timbral tone generator, that can be played from D8 percussion pads (PSD8, PTT8, PBD8) or via MIDI.

External control 
Unlike the Yamaha PCM1 Percussion Control Module, the PTX8 is both a tone generator and trigger module. The PTX8 includes eight 1/4 TS input jacks for connecting the Yamaha EPS-D8 drum pads. The PTX8 is not compatible with later SYSTEM 1 drum pads (PTT1 or PBD1) which used XLR cables.

Voice Synthesis 
The PTX8 includes 12 bit companded PCM wave memory synthesis type. The production of sound is organized into waveforms, voices, kits, and chains as follows:

 Includes 26 internal preset waveforms (additional waveforms can be imported from ROM cartridges) which can be edited to create Voices.
 Up to 64 different voices can be stored in internal memory and a RAM 4 cartridge.
 Each of the 8 independent tone generators can play one of the 64 internal Voices (RAM 4 Voices must be imported before using them).
 These voices receive their own Pitch, Bend, Attack/Decay, Volume, Reverse, and wave loop settings (Panning is not adjustable).
 32 "Kit" memories stores a combination of settings for the 8 tone generators. 32 more drum kits can be stored on RAM4 data cartridge.
 Up to 10 kit memories can be programmed in a "Chain" and stepped through using a footswitch or pad.

Audio output 
The PTX8 has mixed stereo L/R outputs and 8 individual outputs (one per Tone Generator). When none of the individual outputs are being used, tone generators are panned across the stereo output. Tone generators 3 & 4 are panned left, 1, 2, 7, & 8 are panned center; 5 & 6 are panned right. When an individual output is connected, its signal is removed from the stereo mix.

Midi 
The Yamaha PTX8 transmits and receives MIDI messages. Includes MIDI IN / OUT / THRU terminals on the back of the unit. Responds to not on/off and program change. Internal memory can be requested and transmitted via SYSEX.

Sound library 
The voices for the PTX8 were available on 3.5" disks created for the DX7 II FD.

Waveform ROM cartridges 
These waveform ROM cartridges can be used with both the Yamaha RX-5 Digital Rhythm Programmer and the PTX8 Percussion Tome Generator .

 Yamaha WRC01 - RX5 ROM
 Yamaha WRC02 - Jazz/Fusion
 Yamaha WRC03 - Heavy Metal
 Yamaha WRC04 - Effect

Yamaha WRC01 - RX5 ROM 
The WRC01 waveform cartridge, incorporates 28 voices including drum, percussion, and sound effects. The "RX5 ROM' cartridge was shipped with the Yamaha RX5 Digital Rhythm Programmer.

Yamaha WRC02 - Jazz/Fusion 
The WRC02 incorporates 25 voices used in jazz or fusion music.

Yamaha WRC03 - heavy metal 
The WRC03 incorporates 15 voices used in heavy metal music.

Yamaha WRC04 - effect 
The WRC04 incorporates 19 voices used for "effective" sound. Because of the cartridge name it was thought to contain sound effects, instead of the processed drum sounds within.

Notable users/endorsers 

Bobby Blotzer (Ratt)
Peter Erskine

References

Owner's manual 

 PTX8 Percussion tone Generator: Owner's Manual (eng, fr, ger)

Further reading 

 Alex Grahm. Electronic Drumfax. self-published. 2019. .
 "Electronic Percussion". AFTERTOUCH.  No. 25. Yamaha International Corp. October 1987. p. 12. OCLC 20286405
 "Yamaha D8". Modern Drummer. Vol. 13, No. 4. Modern Drummer Publications, Inc. April 1989. p. 44. ISSN 0194-4533. OCLC 946899618.
 "Theme and Variations: The NAMM Report". Music Technology. Vol. 2, Num. 5. Music Technology Ltd. March 1988. p. 85. ISSN 0896-2480. OCLC 16461726.

External links 

 Yamaha Black Boxes | Yamaha PTX8 Percussion tone generator

Drum machines